Calvin Rezende (born January 21, 1993) is a former American soccer player.

Career

College and amateur
Rezende played a year of college soccer at the University of Virginia in 2011, before going to Europe to train with Cádiz and Crotone. He returned to college soccer in 2014, spending two seasons at Saint Francis University.

While at college, Rezende also appeared for Premier Development League sides Michigan Bucks in 2015.

Professional
Along with his twin brother, Conner, Rezende signed with new North American Soccer League club Miami FC on February 1, 2016.

On February 14, 2018, Rezende signed with USL side Penn FC.

Personal
Calvin's twin brother, Conner, also plays professional soccer. He was most recently at Miami FC.

References

External links
 Calvin Rezende's Official Website
 

1993 births
Living people
American soccer players
Virginia Cavaliers men's soccer players
Saint Francis Red Flash men's soccer players
Flint City Bucks players
Miami FC players
Penn FC players
El Paso Locomotive FC players
FC Tulsa players
USL League Two players
North American Soccer League players
USL Championship players
Soccer players from Florida
Sportspeople from Broward County, Florida
People from Davie, Florida
Association football midfielders
F.C. Crotone players
Cádiz CF players
American expatriate soccer players
American expatriate sportspeople in Italy
American expatriate sportspeople in Spain
Expatriate footballers in Italy
Expatriate footballers in Spain